Walter Dungan, Viscount Dungan (c.1650 – 1 July 1690) was an Irish Jacobite soldier and politician.

Dungan was the only son of William Dongan, 1st Earl of Limerick and Euphemia Maria, daughter of Sir Richard Chamber. He was born in Jerez de la Frontera, Spain, but was naturalised by the Parliament of Ireland in 1654.

His father ensured the family's support for James II of England following the Glorious Revolution. In 1689, Dungan was the Member of Parliament for Naas in the brief Patriot Parliament called by James. He was granted a commission in James' army during the Williamite War in Ireland, becoming colonel of Lord Dongan's Dragoons. During the Siege of Derry, he was dispatched to Derry to bring news to the Jacobite commander Richard Hamilton that a Williamite flotilla under Percy Kirke had been sent to relieve the city. He was killed on 1 July 1690 while leading a detachment of Jacobite horse at the Battle of the Boyne.

As a result of Dungan's death, his father's earldom was inherited by special remainder by the first earl's brother, Thomas Dongan.

References

Year of birth unknown
1690 deaths
17th-century Irish people
British courtesy viscounts
Irish Jacobites
Irish MPs 1689
Jacobite military personnel of the Williamite War in Ireland
Members of the Parliament of Ireland (pre-1801) for County Kildare constituencies